This article lists Mispredicted Christian religious predictions that failed to come about in the specified time frame, listed by religious group.

Adventism, Millerism
Adventism has its roots in the teachings of a Baptist preacher by the name of William Miller. He first predicted the Second Advent of Jesus Christ would occur before March 21, 1844. When this date passed, a new date was predicted, April 18, 1844. Again the date passed and another Millerite, Samuel S. Snow, derived the date of October 22, 1844. The non-fulfillment of these predictions has been named the Millerite Great Disappointment.

On May 27, 1856, Ellen G. White, prophet of the Seventh-day Adventist church, wrote: "I was shown the company present at the Conference, Said the angel: 'Some food for worms, some subjects of the seven last plagues, some will be alive and remain upon the earth to be translated at the coming of Jesus.'" A newborn attendee at that conference would have been 100 years old in 1956. "As more and more of the conference attendees died off, the faithful became increasingly excited about soon seeing Jesus. Fifty-four years after the prophecy, they made a check-off list of attendees to show who was still alive and who was deceased—because it was prophesied that Jesus would return while some of them were still alive."

Anabaptist Church 
Certain Anabaptists of the early 16th century believed that the Millennium would occur in 1533. Another source reports: "When the prophecy failed, the Anabaptists became more zealous and claimed that two witnesses (Enoch and Elijah) had come in the form of Jan Matthys and Jan Bockelson; they would set up the New Jerusalem in Münster. Münster became a frightening dictatorship under Bockelson's control. Although all Lutherans and Catholics were expelled from that city, the millennium never came."

Anglican Church 
In volume II of The Prophetic Faith of Our Fathers, author Leroy Edwin Froom writes about a prominent Anglican prelate, who made a relevant prediction:Edwin Sandys (1519–1588), Archbishop of York and Primate of England was born in Lancashire... Sandys says, "Now, as we know not the day and time, so let us be assured that this coming of the Lord is near. He is not slack, as we do count slackness. That it is at hand, it may be probably gathered out of the Scriptures in diverse places. The signs mentioned by Christ in the Gospel which should be the foreshewers of this terrible day, are almost all fulfilled."

Assemblies of God Church 
During World War I, The Weekly Evangel, an official publication of the Assemblies of God, carried this prediction: "We are not yet in the Armageddon struggle proper, but at its commencement, and it may be, if students of prophecy read the signs aright, that Christ will come before the present war closes, and before Armageddon...The war preliminary to Armageddon, it seems, has commenced." Other editions speculated that the end would come no later than 1934 or 1935.

Calvary Chapel 
The founder of the Calvary Chapel system, Chuck Smith, published the book End Times in 1979. On the jacket of his book, Smith is called a "well known Bible scholar and prophecy teacher". In this book he wrote:

This same viewpoint was published by the popular pastor Hal Lindsey in his widely published book The Late Great Planet Earth.

Edward Irving 
The Scottish cleric Edward Irving was the forerunner of the Catholic Apostolic Church. In 1828 he wrote a work headed The Last Days: A Discourse on the Evil Character of These Our Times, Proving Them to be the 'Perilous Times' and the 'Last Days'''. He believed that the world had already entered the "last days":

 Family Radio 

Harold Camping, who was then president of Family Radio, stated that the rapture and Judgement Day would occur on May 21, 2011, and claimed the Bible as his source. He suggested it would happen at 6 p.m. local time with the rapture sweeping the world time zone by time zone. Following the failure of this prediction, Camping stated that the physical rapture was actually happening on October 21, 2011.
 Lutheran Church 
Michael Stiefel predicted the end of the world in 1533 and lost his position as minister in consequence. He was found another position by Philip Melanchthon.

One later writer noted, "In all of [Martin Luther's] work there was a sense of urgency for the time was short... the world was heading for Armageddon in the war with the Turk."

Even after Luther's death in 1546, Lutheran leaders kept up the claim of the nearness of the end. About the year 1584, a zealous Lutheran named Adam Nachenmoser wrote the large volume  in which he predicted: "In 1590 the Gospel would be preached to all nations and a wonderful unity would be achieved. The last days would then be close at hand." Nachenmoser offered numerous conjectures about the date; 1635 seemed most likely.

The Lutheran Church–Missouri Synod issued a study in 1989 refuting any end times claims, declaring that "repeatedly taught by Jesus and the apostles is the truth that the exact hour of Christ's coming remains hidden in the secret counsels of God ( 24:36)".

Latter Day Saints

Joseph Smith, founder of the Mormon faith, made several dozen prophecies during his lifetime, many of which are recorded in the sacred texts of the Mormon faith. The prophecies included predictions of the Civil War, the second coming of Jesus, and several less significant predictions. Church apologists cite prophecies that they claim came true, and church critics cite prophecies that they claim did not come true.

 Mennonites 
Russian Mennonite minister Claas Epp, Jr. predicted that Christ would return on March 8, 1889, and, when that date passed uneventfully, 1891.

Montanists
Montanus, who founded the Montanist movement in 156 AD, predicted that Jesus would return during the lifetime of the group's founding members.

 Presbyterian Church 
Thomas Brightman, who lived from 1562 to 1607, has been called "one of the fathers of Presbyterianism in England." He predicted that "between 1650 and 1695 [we] would see the conversion of the many Jews and a revival of their nation in Palestine...the destruction of the Papacy...the marriage of the Lamb and his wife."

Christopher Love, who lived from 1618 to 1651, predicted that: (1) Babylon would fall in 1758, (2) God's anger against the wicked would be demonstrated in 1759, and (3) in 1763 there would occur a great earthquake all over the world.

Roman Catholic Church
When in 1525 Martin Luther, a former monk, married Katharina von Bora, a former nun, his enemies said that their offspring would fulfill an old tradition that the Antichrist would be the son of such a union. The Catholic scholar and theologian Erasmus remarked that the tradition could apply to thousands of such children.

In 1771, Bishop Charles Walmesley published, under the pen name of "Signor Pastorini", his "General History of the Christian Church from Her Birth to Her Final Triumphant State in Heaven Chiefly Deduced from the Apocalypse of St. John the Apostle and Evangelist". In it he attributed to what he called the fifth age of the Church a duration of 300 years, beginning with the Protestant Reformation in 1520 or 1525. This was widely interpreted as predicting the downfall of Protestantism by 1825. In fact, just four years later, the Roman Catholic Relief Act 1829 brought to a culmination the process of Catholic Emancipation throughout the United Kingdom of Great Britain and Ireland.

 Watch Tower Society (Jehovah's Witnesses) 

Charles Taze Russell, the first president of the Watch Tower Society, calculated 1874 as the year of Christ's Second Coming, and taught that Christ was invisibly present and ruling from the heavens since that year."The writer, among many others now interested, was sound asleep, in profound ignorance of the cry, etc., until 1876, when being awakened he trimmed his lamp (for it is still very early in the morning.) It showed him clearly that the Bridegroom had come and that he is living "in the days of the Son of Man." The Three Worlds and The Harvest of This World by N.H. Barbour and C.T. Russell (1877). Text available online at: http://www.heraldmag.org/olb/contents/history/3worlds.pdf Scan of book in PDF format  Russell proclaimed Christ's invisible return in 1874, the resurrection of the saints in 1875, and predicted the end of the "harvest" and the Rapture of the saints to heaven for 1878, and the final end of "the day of wrath" in 1914. 1874 was considered the end of 6,000 years of human history and the beginning of judgment by Christ. A 1917 Watch Tower Society publication predicted that in 1918, God would begin to destroy churches and millions of their members.

J. F. Rutherford, who succeeded Russell as president of the Watch Tower Society, predicted that the Millennium would begin in 1925, and that biblical figures such as Abraham, Isaac, Jacob, and David would be resurrected as "princes". The Watch Tower Society bought property and built a house, Beth Sarim, in California for their return.

Starting in 1966, statements in Jehovah's Witness publications raised strong expectations that Armageddon could arrive in 1975. In 1974, Witnesses were commended for selling their homes and property to "finish out the rest of their days in this old system" in full-time preaching. In 1976, The Watchtower'' advised those who had been "disappointed" by unfulfilled expectations for 1975 to adjust their viewpoint because that understanding was "based on wrong premises". Four years later, the Watch Tower Society admitted its responsibility in building up hope regarding 1975.

See also 
 False prophet
 Jesus and Messianic prophecy
 List of dates predicted for apocalyptic events
 List of messiah claimants
 Predictions and claims for the Second Coming of Christ
 Religious views of Isaac Newton
 Second Coming
 Six ages of the world

References 

Prophecy in Christianity
Christianity-related controversies